Food Matters is a 2008 film about nutrition. The film presents the thesis that a selective diet can play a key role in treating a range of health conditions such as diabetes, cancer, heart disease and depression, often substituting for medical treatment. Furthermore, it tends to label the medical industry as a "sickness industry", which profits more from treating the symptoms of illness than curing the illness.

References

External links
 
 
 

2008 films
2008 documentary films
Australian documentary films
Documentary films about vegetarianism
Documentary films about conspiracy theories
2000s English-language films